The EOC 12 inch 45 calibre gun were various similar 12-inch wire-wound naval guns designed and manufactured by Elswick Ordnance Company to equip ships that the parent company Armstrong Whitworth built and/or armed for several countries before World War I.

History

Brazil service

Elswick supplied its 12-inch 45-calibre guns for the s completed by itself and Vickers in 1910 for Brazil.

UK service

It was armed with 14 of a slightly later version of Elswick's 12-inch 45-calibre guns. The gun's performance was similar to the standard Royal Navy equivalent gun, the BL 12 inch Mk X designed by Vickers.

Japan service
Elswick supplied its 12-inch 45-calibre guns to the Imperial Japanese Navy, and they were also manufactured under licence in Japan. In Japanese service from 1908 they became 12"/45 41st Year Type and later after the navy metricised in 1917, 30 cm/45 41st Year Type. They equipped the following ship classes:
 s commissioned 1906
  commissioned in 1907 & 1911
  battlecruisers commissioned 1908
 Battleship  as re-gunned in 1908
 s commissioned 1910 & 1912
 s commissioned 1912

Surviving examples

See also
 List of naval guns

Weapons of comparable role, performance and era
 305mm/45 Modèle 1906 gun French equivalent
 BL 12 inch Mk X naval gun Vickers equivalent
 12"/45 caliber Mark 5 gun US equivalent

Notes

References
 Tony DiGiulian, Brazil 12"/45 (30.5 cm) Elswick Pattern L
 Tony DiGiulian, Britain 12"/45 (30.5 cm) Mark XIII
 Japanese 12"/45 (30.5 cm) Armstrong 12"/45 (30.5 cm) 41st Year Type 30 cm/45 (12") 41st Year Type

External links

 

Naval guns of the United Kingdom
Naval weapons of Brazil
305 mm artillery
Elswick Ordnance Company
Naval guns of Japan